The Opel Diplomat is a luxury car manufactured by Opel from 1964 to 1977. Opel's top-ranging models were traditionally the Admiral and Kapitän, introduced in 1938 and 1937 respectively.

In 1964, these models were joined, in the so-called "KAD" (Kapitän, Admiral, Diplomat) range, by the new Opel Diplomat. In most respects the three were badge-engineered versions of the same vehicle.

Diplomat A (1964–1968) 

In February 1964, Opel introduced a new range of flagship models as successors to the Opel Kapitän P-LV of 1959/1963. These KAD models (Opel Kapitän, Admiral and Diplomat; also referred to as "The Big Three" by Opel) were available with 2.6-litre and 2.8-litre in-line six-cylinder petrol engines (100 or 125 PS/99 or 123 hp), or a V8-Chevrolet small-block engine 283 (4.6-litre) teamed with a two-speed Powerglide automatic transmission (190 PS/187 hp). The latter engine was supplanted in the saloon by the V8-Chevrolet small-block Type 327 (5.4-litre) in October 1966 (230 PS/227 hp). As the company's range-topping model, the Diplomat was available only with the V-8.

A Diplomat Coupé, with the 327 engine only, was also available from 1965 to 1967 in limited numbers. The coupé was built by coachbuilder Karmann and cost DM 25,500 (as much as seven Volkswagen Beetles). 347 Coupés were built.

In September 1967, the Diplomat and its less expensive siblings received a light update consisting of rub strips on its flanks, new recirculating ball steering by ZF, and a heated rear window. At the same time, a HL (Hochleistung or high performance) version of the 2.8-liter six became available (140 PS/138 hp) for the Kapitän and Admiral models.

These cars were even larger than their predecessors, stretching to almost 200 inches, and found little favour with the European public. Between February 1964 and November 1968, Opel built 89,277 KAD models (24,249 Kapitäns, 55,876 Admirals and 9,152 Diplomats), whereas its direct predecessor, the Kapitän P-LV, had registered 145,618 sales over a comparable four-year span.

Diplomat B (1969–1977) 

In March 1969, Opel introduced a new line of KAD models with new bodies and a more sophisticated chassis with a De Dion tube rear axle. These cars were slightly smaller than their predecessors. While the lesser models (Opel Kapitän and Admiral) were also available with a carburetted 2.8 L-inline six, the Diplomat could be had with either a fuel-injected version of this engine (Diplomat E) or with Chevrolet's 327-V8 (Diplomat V8), now coupled to a 3-speed TH-400 Turbo-Hydramatic.

The new body was a typical General Motors style and bore a strong resemblance to the contemporary Holden Brougham from GM Australia.

The Diplomat V-8 was hoped to compete with Mercedes' new 350 and 450 SE; from May 1973 Opel even offered a long-wheelbase version of the V-8 to keep up with Mercedes' SEL models. In October 1971 the Diplomat's list of standard features included H1 halogen headlamps, radio antenna integrated into the windscreen and remote-controlled rear view mirror. From January 1972 the 4-speed manual gear box was no longer offered on the Diplomat E. September 1972 saw the introduction of a modified grille with OPEL script relocated from its left side to its central portion. A number of the 'lesser' Admiral cars had their car boot lid fitted with Diplomat lettering/badges. This led to some confusion by today's car buyers, even in the TV series Der letzte Bulle (German), but the cars are easily identified by their vertical headlights for the Diplomat versus horizontal ones for the Admiral.

Opel continued the production until 1977 but found little success in the market: only 61,559 KAD cars were built from March 1969 to late 1977 (of which 4,976 Kapitäns, about 33,000 Admirals and about 23,500 Diplomats). They were superseded in 1978 by the new Opel Senator of a somewhat reduced size and more modern, European styling.

In the early 1970s, GM considered the use of Opel Diplomat as the basis of forthcoming first generation Cadillac Seville. However, the precise panel gap tolerance found in Diplomat was beyond what the GM North American manufacturing plants could do without extensive and expensive changes to the sheetmetal stamping and welding process.

The Diplomat V8 furnished the technical base for the Bitter CD, a limited-production GT. The production of the handbuilt German car used the foolproof chassis, drivetrain, mechanicals, and even the dashboard of the Opel Diplomat. Bitter's enterprise of providing exotic car looks with Opel innards came to an end in the early eighties, when the Opel Diplomat chassis was no longer available to buy from Opel.

References

 Werner Oswald, Deutsche Autos 1945-1975. Motorbuch Verlag, Stuttgart 1975. 

Diplomat
Rear-wheel-drive vehicles
Cars introduced in 1964
1970s cars